Bertucci is a surname of Italian origin "Bertushe."  It translates to mean peaceful communication and often refers to:

Antonia Bertucci-Pinelli (died c. 1640), Italian painter of the Baroque era
Bruno Bertucci (born 1990), Brazilian footballer 
Clarence V. Bertucci (died 1969), American soldier who massacred German POWs at Salina, Utah in 1945
Francesco Antonio Bertucci (fl. 1595), Dalmatian Capuchin and Knight Hospitaller
Giacomo Bertucci (1903–1982), Italian painter
Giovanni Battista Bertucci (fl. early 16th century), Italian painter
Jacopo Bertucci (fl. early 16th century), Italian painter of the Baroque era
Javier Bertucci (born 1969), evangelical pastor, philanthropist, and Venezuelan businessman
Jimi Bertucci (born 1951), Italian Canadian singer, songwriter, musician and composer.
Lina Bertucci (born 1958), American photographer and film artist
Lodovico Bertucci (fl. 17th century), Italian painter of the Baroque era
Lucas Marcolini Dantas Bertucci, known simply as Lucas Bertucci (born 1989), Brazilian footballer
Nicola Bertucci (c. 1710–1777), Italian painter of the late-Baroque or Rococo style
Ughetto Bertucci (1907–1966), Italian film and stage actor
Yves Bertucci (born 1962), French football manager
Bertucci's, Italian restaurant chain

Italian-language surnames